List of Guggenheim Fellowship winners for 1971.

United States and Canada fellows

 Gar Alperovitz, Lionel R. Bauman Professor of Political Economy, University of Maryland.
 Lars V. Ahlfors, Mathematics
 Claudia Andujar, Photographer, Sao Paulo
 Rutherford Aris, Regents' Professor Emeritus of Chemical Engineering, University of Minnesota
 Samuel Gordon Armistead, Professor of Spanish and Comparative Literature, University of California, Davis
 James Richard Arnold, Harold C. Urey Professor Emeritus of Chemistry, University of California, San Diego
 Louis Auslander, Mathematics
 Vernon Duane Barger, Hilldale and J. H. Van Vleck Professor of Physics, University of Wisconsin-Madison
 Robert A. Berner, Alan M. Bateman Professor of Geology and Geophysics, Yale University
 Gerald Duane Berreman, Professor of Anthropology, University of California, Berkeley
 Charles E. Bidwell, William Claude Peavis Professor of Sociology and Education, University of Chicago
 Patrick Paul Billingsley, Emeritus Professor of Statistics and of Mathematics, University of Chicago
 Norman Birnbaum, University Professor, Georgetown University Law Center.
 Julie Bovasso, Deceased. Drama.
 Leo Braudy, University Professor and Bing Professor of English, University of Southern California.
 Matthew Joseph Bruccoli, Jefferies Professor of English, University of South Carolina; President, Bruccoli Clark Layman
 Ed Bullins, Playwright, Berkeley, California.
 Mario A. Bunge, Frothingham Professor of Logic and Metaphysics, McGill University.
 Robbins Burling, Emeritus Professor of Anthropology and Linguistics, University of Michigan.
 Eugene Burnstein, Professor of Psychology, University of Michigan
 Rosemarie Castoro, Sculptor, New York City
 Noam Chomsky, Institute Professor, Department of Linguistics, M.I.T.
 John Desmond Clark, Professor Emeritus of Anthropology, University of California, Berkeley.
 Tom Clark, Poet, Berkeley, California.
 Jerome Alan Cohen, Lawyer, New York City
 Mark Cohen, Photographer, Wilkes-Barre, Pennsylvania
 Paul A. Colinvaux, Adjunct Scientist, Marine Biological Laboratory, Woods Hole, MA
 Lambros Comitas, Gardner Cowles Professor of Anthropology and Education, Columbia University, Teacher's College
 Henry Steele Commager, Deceased. Classics.
 Robert Coover, T. B. Stowell University Professor, Brown University.
 David Cort, General Non-Fiction
 Arlene Croce, Dance Critic, Brooklyn, New York.
 Lee J. Cronbach, Vida Jacks Professor Emeritus of Education, Stanford University
 Leon M. Dorfman, Professor of Chemistry, The Ohio State University.
 Robert Bingham Downs, Bibliography
 Stillman Drake, Deceased. History of Science.
 Troy Duster, Associate Professor of Sociology, University of California, Berkeley.
 Hardy M. Edwards, Jr., Deceased. Professor of Poultry Science, University of Georgia.
 Alfred S. Eichner, Deceased. Economics.
 Melvin Aron Eisenberg, Koret Professor of Law, University of California, Berkeley
 Dale Eldred, Sculptor, Kansas City Missouri.
 Thomas Ferbel, Associate Professor of Physics. University of Rochester.
 Willis H. Flygare, Chemistry
 Stephen Foster, Distinguished Research Professor of History, Northern Illinois University
 Steven Frautschi, Professor of Physics, California Institute of Technology
 Charles Fried, Beneficial Professor of Law, Harvard University.
 Murray Gell-Mann, Robert Andrews Millikan Professor Emeritus of Theoretical Physics, California Institute of Technology.
 Sam Gilliam, Artist, Washington, D.C.
 Grant Gilmore, Deceased. Law.
 Peter Golfinopoulos, Artist; Instructor, Art Students League, New York City
 Philip Gossett, Robert W. Remeker Distinguished Service Professor of Music and the Humanities and Dean, Humanities Division, University of Chicago
 Nathanael Greene, Professor of History, Wesleyan University.
 Vartan Gregorian, President, Carnegie Corporation.
 John J. Gumperz, Emeritus Professor of Anthropology, University of California, Berkeley.
 Thom Gunn, Poet; Retired Senior Lecturer, University of California, Berkeley, San Francisco.
 Karsten Harries, Professor of Philosophy, Yale University
 Heisuke Hironaka, Professor of Mathematics, Harvard University.
 Nathan Irvin Huggins, Deceased. U.S. History.
 Sam Hunter, Professor of Art and Archaeology, Princeton University
 George Izenour, Deceased. Professor Emeritus of Theatre Design and Technology, Director Emeritus of the Electro-mechanical Laboratory, Yale University.
 Bruce Jackson, Samuel P. Capen Professor of English and Comparative Literature, State University of New York at Buffalo
 Kenneth Alan Johnson, Professor of Physics, Massachusetts Institute of Technology
 Aravind Joshi, Henry Salvatori Professor of Computer and Cognitive Science, University of Pennsylvania.
 Gordon L. Kane, Professor of Physics, University of Michigan
 George Anthony Kateb, Professor of Politics, Princeton University
 Henry A. Kelly, Professor of English, University of California, Berkeley.
 Charles S. Klabunde, Creative Arts - Fine Arts.
 Barbara Kolb, Composer, New York City.
 Leonard Kriegel, Professor Emeritus of English, City College, City University of New York.
 Stanley I. Kutler, E. Gordon Fox Professor of American Institutions, University of Wisconsin-Madison
 Everett Carll Ladd, Political Science
 Angeliki Laiou, Former Director, Dumbarton Oaks Research Library and Collection, Professor of Byzantine History, Harvard University, Washington, D.C.
 Joseph LaPalombara, Arnold Wolfers Professor of Political Science, Yale University
 Alexander Leaf, James Jackson Professor of Clinical Medicine at Massachusetts General Hospital, Harvard Medical School
 Stephen J. Lippard, Arthur Amos Noyes Professor of Chemistry, Massachusetts Institute of Technology
 Seymour Martin Lipset, Hazel Professor of Public Policy, George Mason University.
 Charles Ludlam, Deceased. Drama.
 George Mandler, Emeritus Professor of Psychology and Director, Center for Human Information Processing, University of California, San Diego
 Ralph Manheim, Deceased. German Literature and Translation.
 Fred Warren McLafferty, Professor of Chemistry, Cornell University
 William Hardy McNeill, Robert A. Millikan Distinguished Service Professor Emeritus of History, University of Chicago.
 Ved Mehta, Writer, New York City.
 August Meier, University Professor Emeritus of History, Kent State University
 Michael Menaker, Commonwealth Professor of Biology, University of Virginia at Charlottesville
 Ilhan Mimaroglu, Composer, New York City.
 Charles Mingus, Music Composition.
 Robert A. Mundell, Professor of Economics, Columbia University.
 Mark Musa, Professor of Italian, Indiana University.
 Yoichiro Nambu, Harry Pratt Judson Distinguished Professor Emeritus of Physics, University of Chicago.
 Larry Neal, Deceased. American Literature.
 Stephen B. Oates, Professor of History, University of Massachusetts Amherst.
 Rochelle Owens, Playwright, Norman, Oklahoma
 Herbert Leslie Packer, Law
 Philip Pearlstein, Artist; Professor of Art, Brooklyn College, City University of New York.
 Hanna Pitkin, Emeritus Professor of Political Science, University of California, Berkeley.
 Alvin Carl Plantinga, John A. O'Brien Professor of Philosophy, Calvin College.
 Leon B. Plantinga, Professor of the History of Music, Yale University
 John W. Pratt, Professor Emeritus of Business Administration, Harvard University
 Leo Rangell, Clinical Professor of Psychiatry, School of Medicine, University of California, Los Angeles
 Cervin Robinson, Photographer, New York City
 Irwin A. Rose, Senior Member, Institute for Cancer Research; Professor of Physical Biochemistry, University of Pennsylvania
 Leon E. Rosenberg, President, Bristol-Myers Squibb Pharmaceutical Research Institute, Princeton, New Jersey
 Theodore Roszak, Professor of History, California State University, Hayward.
 Elliott Rudwick, U.S. History
 Edward Ruscha, Artist, Los Angeles.
 Loren Rush, Composer, Woodside, California.
 George Beals Schaller, Director for Science, Wildlife Conservation Society, Bronx Park, New York.
 Richard Serra, Artist, New York City.
 Wilfrid Sheed, Writer, Sag Harbor, New York.
 Roger Newland Shepard, Ray Lyman Wilbur Professor Emeritus of Social Science (Psychology), Stanford University
 John A. Simpson, Astronomy-Astrophysics
 Nathan Sivin, Professor of Chinese Culture and of the History of Science, University of Pennsylvania.
 Elliott P. Skinner, Franz Boas Professor of Anthropology, Columbia University.
 William Stanton, Retired Professor of History, University of Pittsburgh
 Ruth Stone, Poet; Professor of English, SUNY Binghamton
 Ulrich P. Strauss, Professor of Chemistry, Rutgers University 
 Walter A. Strauss, Mathematician, Brown University
 George Streisinger, Molecular Biology
 Patrick Suppes, Lucie Stern Professor of Philosophy, Stanford University
 Richard E. Taylor, Physicist, Stanford Linear Accelerator Center, Stanford University
 Twyla Tharp, Choreographer, New York City.
 Gareth Thomas, Professor of Materials Science and Engineering, University of California, Berkeley
 Pravin Varaiya, Nortel Networks Professor of Electrical Engineering and Computer Sciences, University of California, Berkeley
 Ezra F. Vogel, Henry Ford II Professor of the Social Sciences, Harvard University
 Hanes Walton Jr., Professor of Political Science, Savannah State College
 John T. Wasson, Professor of Chemistry and Geophysics, University of California, Los Angeles
 Gerhard L. Weinberg, William Rand Kenan, Jr. Professor Emeritus of History, University of North Carolina at Chapel Hill.
 Henry Wessel, Jr., Photographer; Instructor in Photography, San Francisco Art Institute.
 Richard Winston, Biography
 Ralph K. Winter, Judge, U.S. Court of Appeals for the Second Circuit.
 Neal Wood, Emeritus Professor of Political Science and Political Thought, York University, Canada.
 Norman Zabusky, Deceased. Applied Mathematics.

Latin American and Caribbean Fellows 
 , Writer, Paris
 Carlos R. Alsina, Composer, Viroflay, France
 , Director, National Astronomical Observatory, National University of Colombia
 Edward Kamau Brathwaite, Writer; Professor of Social and Cultural History, University of the West Indies, Kingston, Jamaica
 Haroldo de Campos, Professor of Literature, Pontifical Catholic University of Sao P aulo
 , Professor of Biochemistry, Center for Research and Advanced Studies, National Polytechnic Institute, Mexico City
 Miguel Chase-Sardi, Director, Center for Anthropological Studies, Our Lady of the Assumption Catholic University, Asunción
 Julio Cotler, Professor of Sociology, National University of San Marcos; Director of Research, Institute of Peruvian Studies, Lima
 Antonio Dias, Artist, Köln, Germany
 Juan Downey, Fine Arts
 , Philosophy
 Jorge Elliott, Fine Arts
 , Professor of Educational Psychology, Center for Research and Advanced Studies, National Polytechnic Institute, Mexico City
 , Professor of Paleontology and Paleobotany, National University of the Northeast, Corrientes
 Roberto L. Lobo e Silva, Director, Brazilian Center for Physics Research, Rio de Janeiro
 Carlos Alberto Luengo, Professor of Physics, State University of Campinas
 , Artist, Nogent-sur-Marne, France
 Margaret U. Mee, Biology - Plant Science
 Armando Dias Mendes, Planner
 Alejo Mesa, Research Associate in Biology, University of the State of Sao Paulo, Rio Claro Campus
 , Writer, Madrid
 Alejandro Otero, Fine Arts-Sculpture
 Jorge R. Preloran, Film Maker; Professor Emeritus of Theater Arts, University of California, Los Angeles
 , Professor of Microbiology, Paulista School of Medicine, Sao Paulo
 Fernando von Reichenbach, Director of Applied Technology, Buenos Aires Cultural Center

See also
John Simon Guggenheim Memorial Foundation

External links
Guggenheim Fellows for 1971

1971
1971 awards